Opera Fuoco is a French lyrical ensemble conducted by David Stern.

Presentation 
Founded by David Stern in 2003, Opera Fuoco dedicates itself to the interpretation of operatic repertoire from the beginning of the 18th to the end of the 19th centuries. Consisting of an orchestra playing on period instruments (Katharina Wolff first violin), Opera Fuoco works alongside young professional singers, recruited by audition. From 2008, the Opera Fuoco Troupe is officially created: two or three productions per year, individual support, master-classes, performances for professionals from the music world, etc... Stern and Artistic Advisor and Educational Director Jay Bernfeld jointly oversee the troupe's audition process and development.

In addition, David Stern strongly believes in bringing operatic repertoire to new audiences and particularly in making opera more accessible to children. Since the beginning of its residency at the Theater at Saint-Quentin-en-Yvelines in 2005, many activities were led for and with the children and their families. Elizabeth Askren supervises this educational work.

Opera Fuoco is in residence at the Théâtre de Saint-Quentin-en-Yvelines since 2005.

The troupe 
Created in 2008, the troupe consists of young professional singers, recruited by audition and offers a rigorous program over a two- to three-year period:
 masterclasses surrounding specific themes (the Baroque era, bel canto, role playing, the art of recitative) supervised by David Stern and Jay Bernfeld as well as by world-renowned singers (Jennifer Larmore in 2009, Paul Agnew and Isabelle Poulenard in 2010, and Veronica Cangemi in 2011)
 Individual support when needed as well as other artistic and/or career advice
 Musical Encounters: performances and introductions organized in prestigious venues for sponsors and music professionals.

Educational activities 
The activities below took place at the Théâtre de Saint-Quentin-en-Yvelines. 
 2012 : The Mikado, by Gilbert & Sullivan, with the scenic participation of children on stage
 2011 : Activities around Donizetti's Rita
 2010 : Adaptation of Handel's Giulio Cesare in Egitto, with the scenic participation of children on stage
 2010 : Activities around Telemann's Orpheus
 2009 : Activities around Mozart's Don Giovanni
 2008 : Purcell's Dido and Æneas, with the scenic participation of children on stage
 2006 : Activities around Mozart's La finta giardiniera

Productions 

 2011 : Polixène, by Dauvergne, and Gluck's Iphigénie en Aulide
 2011 : Zanaïda, by Johann Christian Bach
 2011 : Donizetti's Rita
 2010 : Telemann's Orpheus
 2009 : Mozart's Don Giovanni
 2008 : Purcell's Dido and Aeneas
 2007 : Author of Figaro, Beaumarchais in Mozart and Paisiello
 2007 : Telemann's Der Tag des Gerichts
 2006 : Mozart's Der Schauspieldirektor & Salieri's Prima la musica
 2005 : Mozart's La finta giardiniera
 2005 : De Semele à Ino, le conte de deux sœurs, by Handel and Telemann
 2004 : Handel's Jephtha
 2004 : Mozart, air d'opéras et de concerts
 2004 : Cherubini's Médée
 2003 : Handel's Semele
 2003 : Handel's Hercules

Discography 
 2007 : Jephtha – Label Arion
 2004 : Semele – Label Arion

External links
 
 Théâtre de Saint-Quentin-en-Yvelines website
 Fuoco E Cenere website
 Elizabeth Askren website

French classical music groups
Musical groups established in 2003
2003 establishments in France